Wu Xinzhi (2 June 1928 – 4 December 2021) was a Chinese paleoanthropologist, academician of the Chinese Academy of Sciences, and former vice director of the Institute of Vertebrate Paleontology and Paleoanthropology (IVPP).

Biography
Wu was born in Hefei, Anhui, China, in 1928. He graduated with a B.S. in medicine from Shanghai Medical College in 1953, and taught from 1953 to 1958 at the Department of Anatomy, Dalian Medical College. He then attended the graduate school of the Chinese Academy of Sciences. On 5 December 2021, he died of an illness in Beijing, aged 93.

References

1928 births
2021 deaths
People from Hefei
Biologists from Anhui
Chinese paleoanthropologists
Fudan University alumni
Members of the Chinese Academy of Sciences